Richard Chace Tolman (March 4, 1881 – September 5, 1948) was an American mathematical physicist and physical chemist who made many contributions to statistical mechanics. He also made important contributions to theoretical cosmology in the years soon after Einstein's discovery of general relativity. He was a professor of physical chemistry and mathematical physics at the California Institute of Technology (Caltech).

Biography 
Tolman was born in West Newton, Massachusetts and studied chemical engineering at the Massachusetts Institute of Technology, receiving his bachelor's degree in 1903 and PhD in 1910 under A. A. Noyes.

He married Ruth Sherman Tolman in 1924.

In 1912, he conceived of the concept of relativistic mass, writing that "the expression  is best suited for the mass of a moving body."

In a 1916 experiment with Thomas Dale Stewart, Tolman demonstrated that electricity consists of electrons flowing through a metallic conductor. A by-product of this experiment was a measured value of the mass of the electron. Overall, however, he was primarily known as a theorist.

Tolman was a member of the Technical Alliance in 1919, a forerunner of the Technocracy movement where he helped conduct an energy survey analyzing the possibility of applying science to social and industrial affairs.

Tolman was elected a Fellow of the American Academy of Arts and Sciences in 1922. The same year, he joined the faculty of the California Institute of Technology, where he became professor of physical chemistry and mathematical physics and later dean of the graduate school. One of Tolman's early students at Caltech was the theoretical chemist Linus Pauling, to whom Tolman taught the old quantum theory.

In 1927, Tolman published a text on statistical mechanics whose background was the old quantum theory of Max Planck, Niels Bohr and Arnold Sommerfeld. In 1938, he published a new detailed work that covered the application of statistical mechanics to classical and quantum systems. It was the standard work on the subject for many years and remains of interest today.

In the later years of his career, Tolman became increasingly interested in the application of thermodynamics to relativistic systems and cosmology. An important monograph he published in 1934 titled Relativity, Thermodynamics, and Cosmology demonstrated how black body radiation in an expanding universe cools but remains thermala key pointer toward the properties of the cosmic microwave background. Also in this monograph, Tolman was the first person to document and explain how a closed universe could equal zero energy. He explained how all mass energy is positive and all gravitational energy is negative and they cancel each other out, leading to a universe of zero energy. His investigation of the oscillatory universe hypothesis, which Alexander Friedmann had proposed in 1922, drew attention to difficulties as regards entropy and resulted in its demise until the late 1960s.

During World War II, Tolman served as scientific advisor to General Leslie Groves on the Manhattan Project. At the time of his death in Pasadena, he was chief advisor to Bernard Baruch, the U.S. representative to the United Nations Atomic Energy Commission.

Each year, the southern California section of the American Chemical Society honors Tolman by awarding its Tolman Medal "in recognition of outstanding contributions to chemistry."

Family 

Tolman's brother was the behavioral psychologist Edward Chace Tolman.

See also 

List of textbooks in thermodynamics and statistical mechanics
 Tolman length
 Tolman surface brightness test
 Tolman's paradox
 Tolman's H theorem
 Tolman–Ehrenfest effect
 Tolman–Oppenheimer–Volkoff equation
 Tolman–Oppenheimer–Volkoff limit
 Lemaître–Tolman metric
 Lewis–Tolman paradox
 Stewart–Tolman effect
 Oscillatory universe
 Static spherically symmetric perfect fluid
 Thin Man (nuclear bomb)

References

Books by Tolman

 
  Reissued (1987) New York: Dover .
  Reissued (1979) New York: Dover .

External links 
 Short biography from the Online Archive of California
 Short biography from the "Tolman Award" page of the Southern California Section of the American Chemical Society.
 
 
 Biographical memoir, National Academy of Sciences. Includes a complete bibliography of Tolman's writings. Retrieved July 14, 2017.

1881 births
1948 deaths
20th-century American physicists
California Institute of Technology faculty
American cosmologists
Fellows of the American Academy of Arts and Sciences
Manhattan Project people
MIT School of Engineering alumni
People from Newton, Massachusetts
American relativity theorists
American physical chemists